The Federal Office of Metrology and Surveying of Austria (BEV) is the body responsible for official surveying, geo-information and weights and measures (metrology) in Austria. Its headquarters is in Vienna and it has 67 branches spread across all the Austrian federal states.

List of Surveying offices  
Amstetten
Baden
Bludenz
Braunau am Inn
Bregenz
Bruck an der Mur
Eisenstadt
Feldbach
Freistadt
Gänserndorf
Gmünd
Gmunden
Graz
Imst
Innsbruck
Judenburg
Klagenfurt
Korneuburg
Krems an der Donau
Kufstein
Leibnitz
Lienz
Neusiedl am See
Oberwart
Ried im Innkreis
Rohrbach
Salzburg
Spittal an der Drau
St. Johann im Pongau
St. Pölten
Steyr
Villach
Vöcklabruck
Vöklermarkt
Weiz
Wels
Wien
Wiener Neustadt
Zell am See

List of Calibration offices  
Wien
Krems
Eisenstadt
Graz
Klagenfurt
Linz
Salzburg
Innsbruck
Bregenz

See also
(List of) national mapping agencies

References

External links
BEV's digital map of Austria 
BEV home page 
Weights and Measures at the BEV 
BEV's organization chart

Geodesy organizations
National mapping agencies
Standards organisations in Austria
Surveying organizations
Metrology